Borneanapis is a genus of Indonesian araneomorph spiders in the family Anapidae, containing the single species, Borneanapis belalong. It was  first described by R. Snazell in 2009, and has only been found in Indonesia.

References

Anapidae
Monotypic Araneomorphae genera
Spiders of Asia